Raul Fenstad "TJ" Trinidad Jr. (born January 22, 1976) is a Filipino actor.

Filmography

Film

Television

Theater

Awards and nominations

References

External links

1976 births
Living people
Filipino male television actors
Male actors from Batangas
Filipino people of Spanish descent
Star Magic
ABS-CBN personalities
GMA Network personalities